Chris Pym (born 23 April 1966) is  a former Australian rules footballer who played with Richmond in the Victorian Football League (VFL).

Notes

External links 
		

Living people
1966 births
Australian rules footballers from Victoria (Australia)
Richmond Football Club players